Labrys is, according to Plutarch (Quaestiones Graecae 2.302a), the Lydian word for the double-bitted axe. In Greek it was called  (pélekus). The Ancient Greek plural of labrys is labryes.

Etymology
Plutarch relates that the word  was a Lydian word for 'axe': .
Many scholars including Arthur Evans assert that the word labyrinth is derived from labrys and thus implies 'house of the double axe'. A priestly corporation in Delphi was named Labyades; the original name was probably Labryades, servants of the double axe. In Roman times at Patrai and Messene, a goddess Laphria was worshipped, commonly identified with Artemis. Her name was said to be derived from the region around Delphi.

In Crete the "double axe" is not a weapon, and it always accompanies female goddesses, not male gods.

It is also possible that the word labyrinth is derived from the Egyptian, meaning: "the temple at the entrance of the lake”. The Egyptian labyrinth near Lake Moeris is described by Herodotus and Strabo.

A link has also been posited with the double axe symbols at Çatalhöyük, dating to the Neolithic age. In Labraunda in Caria, as well as in the coinage of the Hecatomnid rulers of Caria, the double axe accompanies the storm god Zeus Labraundos. Arthur Evans notes,
 "It seems natural to interpret names of Carian sanctuaries such as Labranda in the most literal sense as the place of the sacred labrys, which was the Lydian (or Carian) name for the Greek  [pelekys], or double-edged axe"
and
"on Carian coins, indeed of quite late date, the labrys, set up on its long pillar-like handle, with two dependent fillets, has much the appearance of a cult image".

Minoan double axe
In ancient Crete, the double axe was an important sacred symbol of the Minoan religion. In Crete the double axe only accompanies female goddesses, never male gods. It seems that it was the symbol of the arche of the creation (Mater-arche). Small versions were used as votive offerings and have been found in considerable numbers; the Arkalochori Axe is a famous example. Minoan double axes have also recently been found in the prehistoric town of Akrotiri (Santorini Island) along with other objects of apparent religious significance.

Ancient Thracian Odrysian Kingdom 
The double axe appears to have carried important symbolism the ancient Thracian Odrysian kingdom related to the Thracian religion and to the royal power. It is argued that in ancient Thrace the double axe was an attribute of Zalmoxis. The double axe appears on coins from Thrace and is believed to be the symbol of the kings of the Odrysae, who believed they could trace their lineage to Zalmoxis. A fresco from the Thracian tomb near Aleksandrovo in south-east Bulgaria, dated to  , depicts a large-size naked man wielding a double axe.

Double axes in the Near East
In the Near East and other parts of the region, eventually, axes of this sort often are wielded by male divinities and appear to become symbols of the thunderbolt, a symbol often found associated with the axe symbol. In Labraunda of Caria the double-axe accompanies the storm-god Zeus Labraundos. Similar symbols have been found on plates of Linear pottery culture in Romania. The double-axe is associated with the Hurrian god of sky and storm Teshub. His Hittite and Luwian name was Tarhun. Both are depicted holding a triple thunderbolt in one hand and a double axe in the other hand. Similarly, Zeus throws his thunderbolt to bring storm. The labrys, or pelekys, is the double axe Zeus uses to invoke storm and, the relatively modern Greek word for lightning is "star-axe" The worship of the double axe was kept up in the Greek island of Tenedos and in several cities in the south-west of Asia Minor, and it appears in later historical times in the cult of the thunder god of Asia Minor (Zeus Labrayndeus).

Ancient Greece
In the context of the mythical Attic king Theseus, the labyrinth of Greek mythology is frequently associated with the Minoan palace of Knossos. It is uncertain, however, that labyrinth can be interpreted as "place of the double axes" and moreover that this should be Knossos; many more have been found, for example, at the Arkalachori Cave, where the famous Arkalochori Axe was found.

On Greek coins of the classical period (e. g. Pixodauros) a type of Zeus venerated at Labraunda in Caria that numismatists call Zeus Labrandeus stands with a sceptre upright in his left hand and the double-headed axe over his shoulder.

Roman Crete

In Roman Crete, the labrys was often associated with the mythological Amazons.

Modern uses

Religion and spirituality
The labrys is sometimes used as a symbol of Hellenic polytheism. As a symbol of the neopagan Goddess movement, the labrys represents the memory of pre-patriarchal matristic societies.

Social movement
In feminist interpretations, the labrys is a symbol of matriarchy.

In Kyrgyzstan, "Labrys" is an LGBT rights organization. The group's goal is to improve the quality of life for all LGBT individuals in their country as well as Central Asia.

Similarly, "Labrisz" is an association in Hungary for lesbian and bisexual women.

Lesbian symbol

In the 1970s, the labrys was adopted by the lesbian community, as a lesbian feminist symbol, representing strength and self-sufficiency.
The labrys lesbian flag, created in 1999, involves a labrys superimposed on an inverted black triangle and set against a violet background.

Culture
The double axe is used by Cretan folklore preservation societies and associations both in Greece and abroad, on occasion with the spelling "lavrys" reflecting modern Greek pronunciation.

Political
In Greece, the labrys was employed as a symbol of Metaxism. During the totalitarian period of the 4th of August Regime (1936–1941), it represented the regime-sponsored National Organization of Youth (EON), as its leader, Ioannis Metaxas, believed it to be the first symbol of all Hellenic civilizations.

The labrys symbol was also used prominently by the Vichy France regime, being featured on the personal flag of Chief of State Philippe Pétain, on coins, and in various propaganda posters.

In the 1960s the labrys was also used by the Italian neo-fascist and far-right movement Ordine Nuovo, most prominently on their flag.

Weapon
While double axes are common in modern high fantasy settings, in reality they were not commonly used in combat.

Sport
Double-bit axes were common in North American forestry: One blade would be sharp and used for felling, whilst the other was a little blunter for limbing. As the forest workers (lumberjacks) were often away from civilization for long periods of time they needed a way to amuse themselves. Thus the sport of double-bit axe throwing was born. In recent decades the sport has been formalised with Swedish company Gränsfors Bruk writing the rules most widely accepted. There are now multiple clubs across Europe that throw double-bit. The sport of double-bit was formalised in the 1990s, whereas hatchet throwing was formalised in 2006.

See also

 Arkalochori Axe
 Axe (tool)
 Battle axe
 Bronze Age sword
 Fasces
 Francisca
 Labrys religious community
 Sagaris

Notes

References

Further reading

External links

 
 

4th of August Regime
Ancient Greece
Axes
Fascist symbols
Feminism and spirituality
Forestry tools
Greek mythology
Heraldic charges
Lesbian culture
LGBT symbols
Minoan culture
Minoan art